The Three Musketeers is a 1966 British TV series based on the 1844 novel The Three Musketeers. It was a serial on the BBC. The series was directed by Peter Hammond and produced by William Sterling.

The serial survived destruction and was released on DVD in 2006.

Cast
Jeremy Brett as D'Artagnan
Brian Blessed as Porthos
Jeremy Young as Athos
Gary Watson as Aramis
Mary Peach as Milady de Winter
Richard Pasco as Cardinal Richelieu
Edward Brayshaw as Rochefort
Billy Hamon as Planchet
Milton Johns as Grimaud
Kathleen Breck as Madame Constance Bonacieux
Michael Miller as M. de Treville
Simon Oates as Duke of Buckingham
Carole Potter as Anne of Austria

The Further Adventures of the Musketeers
It was followed by a sequel series The Further Adventures of the Musketeers.

Cast
Joss Ackland as d'Artagnan
Brian Blessed as Porthos
William Dexter as Cardinal Mazarin
John Woodvine as Aramis
Jeremy Young as Athos
Carole Potter as Queen Anne
Louis Selwyn as King Louis XIV
Edward Brayshaw as Rochefort
Michael Gothard as Mordaunt
Charles Carson as Broussel
David Garth as Charles I
Geoffrey Palmer as Oliver Cromwell
Jennifer Jayne as Madeleine
John Quentin as Duke of Beaufort
Peter Bennett as Bernouin
Nigel Lambert as Planchet 
Fergus McClelland as Raoul De Bragelonne

References

External links

1966 British television series debuts
1960s British television miniseries
Television shows based on The Three Musketeers
BBC Television shows
1966 British television series endings